The 1926 Southern Branch Grizzlies football team was an American football team that represented the Southern Branch of the University of California (later known as UCLA) during the 1926 college football season.  The program, which was later known as the Bruins, was in their second year under head coach William H. Spaulding. The Grizzlies compiled a 5–3 record and outscored their opponents by a combined total of 153 to 67.

Schedule

References

Southern Branch
UCLA Bruins football seasons
Southern Branch Grizzlies football